Krông Pa is a district (huyện) of Gia Lai province in the Central Highlands region of Vietnam.

As of 2003 the district had a population of 62,280. The district covers an area of 1,624 km². The district capital lies at Phú Túc.

References

Districts of Gia Lai province